Atractus lancinii, Lancini's ground snake,  is a species of snake in the family Colubridae. The species can be found in Venezuela.

References 

Atractus
Reptiles of Venezuela
Endemic fauna of Venezuela
Reptiles described in 1961
Taxa named by Janis Roze